The 2000 Liberty Bowl was a college football postseason bowl game played on December 29, 2000, at Liberty Bowl Memorial Stadium in Memphis, Tennessee. The 42nd edition of the Liberty Bowl was played between the Colorado State Rams and the Louisville Cardinals. The game was sponsored by the Axa Equitable Life Insurance Company and was branded as the AXA Liberty Bowl. Colorado State won the game, 22–17; Colorado State running back Cecil Sapp, the game's MVP, ran for a career-high 160 yards and a touchdown.

References

Liberty Bowl
Colorado State Rams football bowl games
Louisville Cardinals football bowl games
Liberty Bowl